A drifter is a type of fishing boat. They were designed to catch herring in a long drift net. Herring fishing using drifters has a long history in the Netherlands and in many British fishing ports, particularly in East Scottish ports.

Until the mid-1960s fishing fleets in the North Sea comprised drifters and trawlers, with the drifters primarily targeting herring while the trawlers caught cod, plaice, skate and haddock, etc. By the mid-1960s the catches were greatly diminishing, particularly the herring. Consequently, the drifter fleet disappeared and many of the trawlers were adapted to work as service ships for the newly created North Sea oil rigs.

Some history of drifters is covered in Scottish east coast fishery.

Drifters preserved as museum ships include Lydia Eva, a steam drifter of the herring fishing fleet based in Great Yarmouth, Norfolk, and Reaper, a restored Scottish Fifie herring drifter at the Scottish Fisheries Museum.

Naval drifters were boats built in the same way used by the Royal Navy primarily to maintain and patrol anti-submarine nets. They were either purpose-built for naval use or requisitioned from private owners.

Image gallery

See also
 Herring Buss (Dutch precursor to the drifter)
 Fifie (widely used early drifter in Scotland)
 Manx nobby
 History of fishing in the United Kingdom
 Tradewind (schooner)
 Wylde Swan

References

External links
http://www.lydiaeva.org.uk/

Fishing in Scotland
Types of fishing vessels
Nautical terminology